Shunila Ruth (born 30 June 1953) is a Pakistani politician who had been a member of the National Assembly of Pakistan from August 2018 till January 2023. Previously she was a Member of the Provincial Assembly of the Punjab, from May 2013 to May 2018.

Early life and education
She was born on 30 June 1953 in Gujranwala.

She graduated from Kinnaird College for Women University in 1973. She received the degree of Master of Arts in English in 1976 from Forman Christian College.

Political career

She was elected to the Provincial Assembly of the Punjab as a candidate of Pakistan Tehreek-e-Insaf (PTI) on reserved seat for minorities in 2013 Pakistani general election.

She was elected to the National Assembly of Pakistan as a candidate of PTI on a reserved seat for minorities in 2018 Pakistani general election.

References

Living people
Punjab MPAs 2013–2018
Pakistan Tehreek-e-Insaf MNAs
1953 births
Women members of the Provincial Assembly of the Punjab
Pakistani MNAs 2018–2023
Pakistani Christians
People from Gujranwala
21st-century Pakistani women politicians